Álvaro Gómez González (born 24 December 1980) is a Chilean actor and theatre director.

Personal life 
Gómez was in a relationship with dancer Francini Amaral from 2010 to 2015. As of 2019, he is engaged to artist Florencia Arenas.

Filmography

Movies

Television

Telenovelas

TV Series

Theatre

References

Sources 
 

1980 births
People from Osorno, Chile
Living people
Chilean male television actors
Chilean male film actors
Chilean male stage actors